Dr. John Milton Hoberman is a Professor of Germanic languages within the Department of Germanic Studies at the University of Texas at Austin. He is the author of numerous books and articles on sports, specifically on their cultural impact, their relationship with race, and the issue of doping.

He is a European cultural and intellectual historian, who has interests in Sportwissenschaft and the history of racial ideas. He has published nearly one hundred sports articles and books in American newspapers and magazines and in Der Spiegel. As he is fluent in Scandinavian languages as well as German, he was e.g. co-editor for the North American sport historians of their special issue on 'German sports history. He is a Fellow of the European committee for sports history.

Testosterone Dreams

His most recent book, Testosterone Dreams, is a history of the use of hormone treatments for lifestyle and performance enhancement during the last century, in the context of an analysis of modern society's ever-increasing use of chemical enhancements in general and its effect on human self-image. It focuses in particular on the early commercial marketing of the hormone testosterone, which is considered representative of all the performance-enhancing drugs that followed it.

Book excerpts

"Testosterone dreams are the fantasies of hormonal rejuvenation, sexual excitement, and supernormal human performance that have been inspired by testosterone since it was first synthesized in 1935."

"Within a generation, sports audiences around the world were enjoying record-breaking performances achieved by athletes whose "productive power" was boosted by testosterone-based anabolic steroids. The "doping" of athletes with androgens and other hormones can thus be understood as one of the human enhancements that will precipitate an unprecedented crisis of human identity during the twenty-first century."

"As more drugs are finding new and often unexpected uses, the distinction between illegitimate doping and socially acceptable forms of drug-assisted productivity is gradually disappearing. One consequence of this vanishing boundary is that the de facto legitimizing of a drug can also create an implicit or even explicit obligation to use it for purposes society or certain subcultures define as desirable."

"Such scenarios show how hard it can be to determine where therapy ends and performance enhancement begins. This uncertainty about the boundary between healing and enhancement changes our sense of what is "normal" and what is not. If I become fatigued while my drug-taking coworkers stay alert, their "supernormal" stamina may well recalibrate the very idea of normal functioning. Their greater productivity might eventually legitimize their doping habit and make it compulsory for everyone. In this work environment, it is the drug-free worker who is in a state of deficiency."

Controversy

In 1997, Dr. Hoberman became a source of controversy with the release of his book Darwin's Athletes: How Sport Has Damaged Black America and Preserved the Myth of Race, over its highly critical analysis of the relationships between sport and African American culture. Accusations of racism and ethnocentrism were leveled at him; however, actual excerpts from the book seemed to show his extreme opposition to racism, and in later materials (see "How Not to Misread Darwin’s Athletes") he acknowledged his unfortunate naïveté regarding how a white author would be perceived when writing on such a topic. Overall, the scholarly and critical reactions to the book were largely positive.

Book excerpts

"[T]he presence of large numbers of black athletes in the major sports appears to have persuaded almost everyone that the process of integration has been a success. This sense of closure is an illusion that is rooted not in the fact of racial equality but in a combination of black apathy and white public relations efforts."

"The Jackie Robinson story has long served white America, and liberals in particular, as a deeply satisfying combination of entertainment and civic virtue that has simultaneously permitted disengagement from less tractable and more important interracial tasks, such as the pursuit of educational and military equality."

Bibliography

 John Hoberman &  Arnd Krüger (eds.). Journal of sport history 17(2) 1990 (Special Issue: 'German sports historiography')

References

Arkansas Democrat-Gazette, By Philip Martin, January 23, 2000
University of Texas, Austin, Germanic Studies faculty

External links
The Testosterone Dreams page at The University of California Press
Academic Website at the University of Texas: Curriculum Vitae for Dr. John Hoberman
University of Texas website article from 2004 about the writing of Testosterone Dreams
"How Not to Misread Darwin’s Athletes: A Response to Jeffrey T. Sammons"
"Steroids, Sluggers, and the War on Drugs" - DRCNet, March 2005

Year of birth missing (living people)
Living people
Intellectual historians
21st-century American historians
21st-century American male writers
Sports historians
History of sports in the United States
University of Texas at Austin faculty
American male non-fiction writers